Teethed Glory and Injury is the third and final studio album by the Irish black metal band Altar of Plagues produced by Jaime Gomez Arellano who previously did work for Ghost B.C. and Ulver. It was released on April 30, 2013 through Candlelight Records and Profound Lore Records. Prior to the album's release, a music video was released for the track "God Alone", whence the album cover is derived.

Track listing

Personnel
Altar of Plagues
James Kelly – vocals, guitars, keyboards
Dave Condon – vocals, bass
Johnny King – drums

Producer
Jaime Gomez Arellano – mastering, mixing and production

References

External links

Teethed Glory and Injury at Encyclopaedia Metallum

2013 albums
Altar of Plagues albums
Profound Lore Records albums
Candlelight Records albums